LEQ may refer to:
Land's End Airport's IATA code
Lembena language's ISO 639-3 code
Leq or equivalent continuous sound level, see Sound level meter#LAT or Leq: Equivalent continuous sound level
Long essay question, a type of question on some Advanced Placement exams

See also
Less than or equal to, encoded as leq in some schemes